CargoNet AS is the primary operator of freight trains on the Norwegian railway system. It was formed as NSB Gods after NSB (now Vy) fissioned into a passenger and a freight company. NSB Gods changed its name to CargoNet at the beginning of 2002. It was originally owned by NSB (55% share hold) and the Swedish freight company Green Cargo; however Green Cargo sold their share to NSB in 2010, making the latter the sole owner. The Norwegian CargoNet AS has a subsidiary company in Sweden called CargoNet AB which was purchased as RailCombi AB.

Twenty-three terminals are served by CargoNet, predominantly in Norway and Sweden; operations provide both container and bulk-cargo trains.

Locomotives
Locomotives of type El 14, CD 66, and some of the El 16s have a dark gray livery with a checkered yellow and black stripe somewhere. This is a partly "refreshment" of the gray NSB-Gods livery. The Di 8 and some shunters tend to use the older yellow livery with a red driver's cab (about half of the Di 8 has got new livery in silver with yellow stripe and yellow checkered "arrow" on the side). The rest of the locomotives (El 16, CE 119 and CD 312) got new livery in silver, with yellow stripe along the side, and a checkered yellow "arrow".

External links

CargoNet stock list

Railway companies of Norway
Railway companies established in 2002
2002 establishments in Norway
Norwegian State Railways